Hanji-Bough is a small village in Magam tehsil of district Budgam in Indian union territory of Jammu and Kashmir. According to Census 2011 the location code or village code of Hanji-Bough village is 000453. Hanji-Bough village falls in Magam Tehsil of Budgam district in Jammu & Kashmir, India. It is situated 10 km away from sub-district headquarter Beerwah and 25 km away from district headquarter Budgam. As per 2009 stats, Peth Kanihama is the gram panchayat of Hanji-Bough village.

The total geographical area of village is 59.9 hectares. The total population of Hanji-Bough village is 1105 out of which 592 are males and 513 females. There are about 122 houses in Hanji-Bough village. Hanji-Bough is 10 minutes walking distance from Magam town. The village is located on the right bank of a River known as Nallah-e-Sukhnag (which originates from Tosemaidan and is famous for its water quality). Sukhnag River is one of the major left bank tributary of River Jhelum. This village is famous for its chinar and walnut trees. Presently, the village is divided into two wards, and is under halqa Pethkanihama. Its pincode is 193401.

The majority of the people are dependent on agriculture and handicrafts, a few of them are engaged with business also. There is a famous shrine of Syed Taj-u-Din Bukhari(R.A) located on the bank of the River sukhnag. There used to a big playground, known famously as 'Dhoonkul-Bagh' in the village, however, it no longer exists there. The village owns its own big Eid-Gah on the bank of River, and people offer Eid Nimaz there. The Village is a great example of unity and brotherhood, as people are always there to offer help to needy ones. The major castes of this small village are: Lone, Dar, Ganie and minor castes are: Malik, Bhat and Sheikh. The village has two Masjids, including a big Jamia Masjid, a single primary school, and a health dispensary.

References 

Villages in Budgam district